The 1961 All-Ireland Senior Hurling Championship Final was the 74th All-Ireland Final and the culmination of the 1961 All-Ireland Senior Hurling Championship, an inter-county hurling tournament for the top teams in Ireland. The match was held at Croke Park, Dublin, on 3 September 1961, between Tipperary and Dublin. The Leinster champions lost to their Munster opponents on a scoreline of 0-16 to 1-12.

Match details

All-Ireland Senior Hurling Championship Final
All-Ireland Senior Hurling Championship Final, 1961
All-Ireland Senior Hurling Championship Final
All-Ireland Senior Hurling Championship Finals
Dublin GAA matches
Tipperary GAA matches